The Alcorn State Braves are the college football team of Alcorn State University. The Braves play in NCAA Division I Football Championship Subdivision as a member of the Southwestern Athletic Conference (SWAC).

History

Classifications
1964–1969: NAIA
1970–1983: NAIA Division I
1965–1972: NCAA College Division
1973–1976: NCAA Division II
1977: NCAA Division I
1978–present: NCAA Division I–AA/FCS

Conference memberships
1921–1935: Independent
1935–1962: South Central Athletic Conference
1962–present: Southwestern Athletic Conference

Championships

Black college national championships
 1968
 1969
 1974
 1984
 2014

SWAC championships
The Alcorn Braves joined the Southwestern Athletic Conference SWAC in 1962. Since then, ASU has won SWAC championships.

 1968
 1969
 1970
 1974
 1976
 1979
 1984

 1992
 1994
 2014
 2015
 2018
 2019

Playoff appearances

NCAA Division I FCS
The Braves have appeared in the I-AA/FCS playoffs three times with an overall record of 0–3.

NCAA Division II
The Braves appeared in the Division II playoffs one time, with an overall record of 0–1.

Rivalry games
The Alcorn State Braves take on the Jackson State Tigers in the Soul Bowl. The rivalry was previously named the Capital City Classic, but Alcorn ended the Classic in 2012 so that it could be brought to Lorman.

College Football Hall of Fame members
Marino Casem
Steve McNair

Alumni in the NFL
Over 50 Alcorn State alumni have played in the NFL, including:

Milton Barney
Charles Coleman
Donald Driver
Leonard Fairley
Leslie Frazier
Marcus Hinton
Billy Howard
Nate Hughes

Garry Lewis
Steve McNair
Bryant Mix
Lawrence Pillers
Elex Price
Jack Spinks
Roynell Young
Henry Bradley
Willie Young

Head Coaches
Alcorn State has seen 21 head football coaches over its history. The program is currently led by Fred McNair.

Notes
 Hopson went 4–7 and 9–3 in the 2012 and 2013 seasons, respectively, but the school's wins from these seasons were vacated due to NCAA violations

See also
 List of black college football classics

References

External links
 

 
American football teams established in 1921
1921 establishments in Mississippi